Timothy Cheatwood (born November 5, 1978) is an arena football linebacker who is currently a free agent. He played college football at Ohio State University, and was a linebacker in the Canadian Football League (CFL) from 2002 to 2007. He then played in the AFL as a linebacker from 2010 to 2013.

Cheatwood was an CFL Eastern Division All-Star in 2003 and 2004, and he was a CFL All-Star in 2004 when he led the league with 14 sacks.

External links
 Tim Cheatwood at cflpa.com

1978 births
Living people
American football linebackers
Canadian football linebackers
Players of Canadian football from Cleveland
Edmonton Elks players
Hamilton Tiger-Cats players
Houston Texans players
Montreal Alouettes players
Mahoning Valley Thunder players
Cleveland Gladiators players
Orlando Predators players
Cleveland Gladiators coaches
Players of American football from Cleveland